This is a list of known stage works by the playwright and librettist Eugène Scribe. He used many pen-names, and contributed anonymously to various works, and it is not known how many works are omitted from the published lists. Estimates differ considerably of the number of stage works he wrote or co-wrote: the published edition of his known works runs to 76 volumes, but it is inevitably incomplete, because of his practice of writing pseudonymously or anonymously. His total output of stage works is variously reckoned as between 300 and nearly 500. They include more than 120 librettos for 48 composers, collaborations in musical and non-musical theatre with more than 60 co-authors, and over 130 stage works written solo. The information below is from the Grand dictionnaire universel du XIXe siècle, edited by Pierre Larousse, and Grove's Dictionary of Music and Musicians.  Scribe wrote some novels, which made little impression and are not listed here.

List of stage works

Plays adapted into opera libretti
1831: A ballet-pantomime became the basis of the Italian libretto for Bellini's La sonnambula
1832: Le philtre was adapted by Felice Romani into the libretto for Donizetti's L'elisir d'amore
1902: Adriana Lecouvreur (written in collaboration with Ernest Legouvé) was adapted into a libretto by Arturo Colautti for Francesco Cilea's Adriana Lecouvreur

Films

Many of the stage works on which Scribe worked have been adapted for the cinema. They include:
The Dumb Girl of Portici, directed by Phillips Smalley and Lois Weber (1916, based on the opera La muette de Portici)
, directed by Rudolf Biebrach (Germany, 1917, based on the play Les Doigts de fée)
Masked Ball, directed by Alfréd Deésy (Austria-Hungary, 1917, based on the opera Un ballo in maschera)
La Calomnie, directed by Maurice Mariaud (France, 1918, based on the play La Calomnie)
, directed by Luise Kolm and Jacob Fleck (Austria-Hungary, 1918, based on the opera La Juive)
Adriana Lecouvreur, directed by Ugo Falena (Italy, 1919, based on the play Adrienne Lecouvreur)
La moglie che si gettò dalla finestra, directed by Gian Bistolfi (Italy, 1920, based on the play Une femme qui se jette par la fenêtre)
The Mute of Portici, directed by Arthur Günsburg (Germany, 1922, based on the opera La muette de Portici)
A Glass of Water, directed by Ludwig Berger (Germany, 1923, based on the play Le Verre d'eau)
The Faces of Love, directed by Carmine Gallone (Italy, 1924, based on the play Adrienne Lecouvreur) 
, directed by Telemaco Ruggeri (Italy, 1924, based on the opera La muette de Portici)
Der Kampf um den Mann, directed by Hans Werckmeister and Armand Guerra (Germany, 1928, based on the play La Bataille de Dames) 
Dream of Love, directed by Fred Niblo (1928, based on the play Adrienne Lecouvreur) 
The Black Domino, directed by Victor Janson (Germany, 1929, based on the opera Le Domino noir)
Devil-May-Care, directed by Sidney Franklin (1929, based on the play La Bataille de Dames)
, directed by Mario Bonnard (France, 1931, based on the opera Fra Diavolo)
Fra Diavolo, directed by Mario Bonnard (Germany, 1931, based on the opera Fra Diavolo)
The Devil's Brother, directed by Hal Roach (1933, based on the opera Fra Diavolo)
The Ambassador, directed by Baldassarre Negroni (Italy, 1936, based on the play Le Diplomate)
Adrienne Lecouvreur, directed by Marcel L'Herbier (France, 1938, based on the play Adrienne Lecouvreur)
, directed by Amleto Palermi (Italy, 1941, based on the opera L'elisir d'amore)
The Queen of Navarre, directed by Carmine Gallone (Italy, 1942, based on the play Les Contes de la reine de Navarre)
, directed by Mario Costa (Italy, 1946, based on the opera L'elisir d'amore)
Sicilian Uprising, directed by Giorgio Pastina (Italy, 1949, based on the opera Les vêpres siciliennes)
Adriana Lecouvreur, directed by Guido Salvini (Italy, 1955, based on the play Adrienne Lecouvreur)
A Glass of Water, directed by Helmut Käutner (West Germany, 1960, based on the play Le Verre d'eau)

Notes, references and sources

Notes

References

Sources

 
 

Libretti by Eugène Scribe
Plays by Eugène Scribe